The  was a proposed nuclear power plant in Maki in Niigata Prefecture but the application was withdrawn. It would have been operated by the Tōhoku Electric Power Company.

The site was a former village that had been buried in sand and became a ghost town in 1971.

Time line
1982 initial application for permission to build the plant
1983 Analysis halted
1994 the mayor of Maki called for the mothballed plan to be revisited. During the same year there was a local referendum.
 1995: Mayor resigns, replaced with anti-nuclear mayor
 1996: Anti-nuclear mayor holds referendum, townspeople veto reactor
 1999: Ghost town land sold to anti-nuclear faction
 2003: Pro-nuclear minority loses Supreme Court battle, Tohoku Electric announces application will be withdrawn
2 February 2004 withdrawal of application

Nuclear history of Japan
Cancelled nuclear power stations